A Borrowed Life is a 1994 Taiwanese film and the directorial debut of Wu Nien-jen. The film depicts cultural and regime change in Taiwan.

The film's running time is 167 minutes. Reviews by Ken Eisner in Variety and Stephen Holden in The New York Times noted that the film was autobiographical and told largely from the perspective of director Wu Nien-jen as a child. Eisner was critical of the film for its excessive focus on the father-son relationship, which left other characters' viewpoints unexplored. Chen Kuan-Hsing examined languages and dialects used in the film, linking differences to the cultural changes portrayed within, as Japanese rule was lifted and the Kuomintang assumed control of Taiwan.

Selected cast
Tsai Chen-nan as Sega
Kerris Tsai as Sega's wife
Chung Yo-hong, Cheng Kwei-chung and Fu Jun as Wen Jian
Peng Wan-chun  as sister
Lee Chuo-liang as brother
Akio Chen as Nomu, Sega's neighbor
 as Sega's mother
 as Sega's father
, Akiko, Nomu's wife
Chen Shu-fang, Akiko's mother

Awards and reception
The film won the Grand Prize (Prize of the City of Torino for Best Film - International Feature Film Competition) at the Torino Film Festival in Italy, a FIPRESCI/NETPAC Award at the 1995 Singapore International Film Festival and the Silver Alexander Award as well as the FIPRESCI Prize (International Federation of Film Critics Award) at the 1994 Thessaloniki Film Festival in Greece. It also received the Golden Horse Audience Choice Award.

Martin Scorsese considered A Borrowed Life the third best movie of the decade.

References

External links

1994 films
1990s biographical drama films
1990s Japanese-language films
1990s Mandarin-language films
Taiwanese biographical films
Hokkien-language films
Films with screenplays by Wu Nien-jen
Films about father–son relationships
Taiwanese drama films
1994 directorial debut films
1994 drama films